The 2016–17 UEFA Youth League was the fourth season of the UEFA Youth League, a European youth club football competition organised by UEFA.

Chelsea were the title holders after winning the previous two editions. However, since the UEFA Youth League title holders were not given an automatic qualifying place, and both the Chelsea senior team failed to qualify for the 2016–17 UEFA Champions League and the Chelsea academy team failed to win the 2015–16 Professional U18 Development League 1, they did not qualify for this tournament to defend their title.

Red Bull Salzburg won their first title after defeating Benfica 2–1 in the final. This was the first occasion that the winner (or a finalist) had come through the Domestic Champions Path of the competition and as of 2022 the only season not to won by a side whom previously have won a European trophy.

Teams
A total of 64 teams from 40 of the 55 UEFA member associations entered the tournament, with Macedonia, Republic of Ireland and Montenegro entering for the first time. They were split into two sections:
The youth teams of the 32 clubs which qualified for the 2016–17 UEFA Champions League group stage entered the UEFA Champions League Path.
The youth domestic champions of the top 32 associations according to their 2015 UEFA country coefficients entered the Domestic Champions Path. Associations without a youth domestic champion as well as domestic champions already included in the UEFA Champions League path were replaced by the next association in the UEFA ranking.

Notes

Squads
Players had to be born on or after 1 January 1998, with a maximum of three players per team born between 1 January 1997 and 31 December 1997 are allowed.

Round and draw dates
The schedule of the competition is as follows (all draws are held at the UEFA headquarters in Nyon, Switzerland, unless stated otherwise).

Notes
For the UEFA Champions League Path group stage, in principle the teams play their matches on Tuesdays and Wednesdays, the same day as the corresponding senior teams in the UEFA Champions League; however, matches may also be played on other dates, including Mondays and Thursdays.
For the Domestic Champions Path first and second rounds, in principle matches are played on Wednesdays; however, matches may also be played on other dates, including Mondays, Tuesdays and Thursdays.
For the play-offs, round of 16 and quarter-finals, in principle matches are played on Tuesdays and Wednesdays; however, matches may also be played on other dates, provided they are completed before the following dates:
Play-offs: 10 February 2017
Round of 16: 24 February 2017
Quarter-finals: 17 March 2017

UEFA Champions League Path

For the UEFA Champions League Path, the 32 teams were drawn into eight groups of four. There was no separate draw held, with the group compositions identical to the draw for the 2016–17 UEFA Champions League group stage, which was held on 25 August 2016, 18:00 CEST, at the Grimaldi Forum in Monaco.

In each group, teams play against each other home-and-away in a round-robin format. The eight group winners advance to the round of 16, while the eight runners-up advance to the play-offs, where they are joined by the eight second round winners from the Domestic Champions Path. The matchdays are 13–14 September, 27–28 September, 18–19 October, 1–2 November, 22–23 November, and 6–7 December 2016.

Group A

Group B

Group C

Group D

Group E

Group F

Group G

Group H

Domestic Champions Path

For the Domestic Champions Path, the 32 teams were drawn into two rounds of two-legged home-and-away ties. The draw was held on 30 August 2016, 13:45 CEST, at the UEFA headquarters in Nyon, Switzerland. There were no seedings, but the 32 teams were split into four groups defined by sporting and geographical criteria prior to the draw.

The eight second round winners advance to the play-offs, where they are joined by the eight group runners-up from the UEFA Champions League Path. If the aggregate scores are level after full-time of the second leg, the away goals rule is used to decide the winner. If still tied, the match is decided by a penalty shoot-out (no extra time is played).

First round
The first legs were played on 21, 27, 28, 29 September and 5 October, and the second legs were played on 19 October 2016.

Second round
The first legs were played on 2, 9 and 16 November, and the second legs were played on 22, 23 and 30 November 2016.

Play-offs

For the play-offs, the 16 teams were drawn into eight ties played over one match. The draw was held on 12 December 2016, 14:00 CET, at the UEFA headquarters in Nyon, Switzerland. The eight second round winners from the Domestic Champions Path were drawn against the eight group runners-up from the UEFA Champions League Path, with the teams from the Domestic Champions Path hosting the match. Teams from the same association could not be drawn against each other.

The eight play-off winners advance to the round of 16, where they are joined by the eight group winners from the UEFA Champions League Path. If the scores are level after full-time, the match is decided by a penalty shoot-out (no extra time is played). The play-offs were played on 7 and 8 February 2017.

Knockout phase

For the knockout phase (round of 16 onwards), the 16 teams were drawn into a single-elimination tournament, with all ties played over one match. The draw was held on 10 February 2017, 13:00 CET, at the UEFA headquarters in Nyon, Switzerland. The mechanism of the draws for each round is as follows:
In the draw for the round of 16, the eight group winners from the UEFA Champions League Path were drawn against the eight play-off winners. Teams from the same UEFA Champions League Path group could not be drawn against each other, but teams from the same association could be drawn against each other. The draw also decided the home team for each round of 16 match.
In the draws for the quarter-finals onwards, there were no seedings, and teams from the same UEFA Champions League Path group or the same association could be drawn against each other. The draws also decided the home team for each quarter-final, and the "home" team for administrative purposes for each semi-final and final (which were played at a neutral venue).

If the scores were level after full-time, the match was decided by a penalty shoot-out (no extra time was played).

Bracket (round of 16 onwards)

Round of 16
The round of 16 matches were played on 21 and 22 February 2017.

Quarter-finals
The quarter-finals were played on 7 and 8 March 2017.

Semi-finals
The semi-finals were played on 21 April 2017 at Colovray Stadium, Nyon.

Final
The final was played on 24 April 2017 at the Colovray Stadium in Nyon, Switzerland.

Statistics

Top goalscorers

Top assists

References

External links

2016–17 UEFA Youth League

 
Youth
2016-17
Uefa Youth League
Uefa Youth League